Yusof Zehi or Yusef Zehi may refer to:
 Yusof Zehi, Chabahar
 Yusef Zehi, Hirmand